Michael C. Kennedy (born August 6, 1962) is a Canadian curler from Edmundston, New Brunswick.

Curling career 
Kennedy is a former Canadian and World Senior Curling Champion. He won both the 2013 Canadian Senior Curling Championships and 2014 World Senior Curling Championships playing third for the Wayne Tallon rink. Kennedy has also won two provincial seniors titles, winning with Tallon in 2013 and playing third for Mark Armstrong in 2014.

As a junior curler, Kennedy won a provincial championship playing third for the Ron Healey rink in 1980.

Kennedy has been one of the perennial top skips in New Brunswick since the 1990s. Kennedy won his first provincial men's championship in 1992, earning the right to represent New Brunswick at the 1992 Labatt Brier. There, he led his team of Brad Fitzherbert, Tom Harris and Dave Coster to a 3-8 finish. The next year, Kennedy won another provincial title, this time with Mark LeCocq replacing Harris at second. The team improvinced on the 1992 performance, by finishing 5-6 at the 1993 Labatt Brier. Kennedy returned to the Brier in 1996 with new teammates Grant Odishaw and Rick Perron along with LeCocq. At the '96 Brier, Kennedy once again led New Brunswick to a 5-6 record.

Kennedy would not return to the Brier for another 12 years. This time Kennedy played third for the James Grattan rink.  The team went 2-9 at the 2008 Tim Hortons Brier. Eight years later Kennedy would be back at the Brier, throwing skip rocks for New Brunswick at the 2016 Tim Hortons Brier with teammates Scott Jones, LeCocq and Jamie Brannen.

Personal life
Kennedy works as an IT Manager at Twin Rivers Paper Co. He is married and has three children.

References

External links
 

Curlers from New Brunswick
Living people
People from Edmundston
1962 births
Canadian male curlers